When the Evening Bells Ring is a 1951 West German drama film directed by Alfred Braun and starring Willy Birgel, Maria Holst and Paul Hörbiger. It was shot at the Tempelhof Studios in West Berlin with sets designed by the art director Gabriel Pellon. It is unrelated to the 1930 silent film of the same title.

Cast
 Willy Birgel as Albrecht von Finke
 Maria Holst as Gloria Römer
 Paul Hörbiger as Lehrer Storm
 Hans Holt as Michael
 Julia Fjorsen as Rosemarie
 Käthe Haack as Frau Brenda
 Peter Voß as Gutsherr von Brenda
 Rudolf Platte
 Hilde Körber
Alfred Braun
 Aribert Wäscher
 Hilde Sessak
 Otto Gebühr

References

Bibliography 
 Hake, Sabine. Popular Cinema of the Third Reich. University of Texas Press, 2001.

External links 
 

1951 films
West German films
German drama films
1951 drama films
1950s German-language films
Films directed by Alfred Braun
Gloria Film films
German black-and-white films
1950s German films
Films shot at Tempelhof Studios